All Men Are Enemies is a 1934 American pre-Code drama film directed by George Fitzmaurice and written by Lenore J. Coffee. The film stars Helen Twelvetrees, Mona Barrie, Hugh Williams, Herbert Mundin, Henry Stephenson and Walter Byron. The film was released on April 20, 1934, by Fox Film Corporation. It is based on the 1933 novel of the same title by Richard Aldington about a British aristocratic who falls in love with an Austrian woman, before they are separated by the outbreak of the First World War.

The film was not a success at the box office, losing $223,000.

Cast
Helen Twelvetrees as Katha
Mona Barrie as Margaret Scrope
Hugh Williams as Tony Clarendon
Herbert Mundin as Noggins
Henry Stephenson as Scrope
Walter Byron as Walter Ripton
Una O'Connor as Annie
Matt Moore as Allerton
Halliwell Hobbes as Clarendon
Rafaela Ottiano as Filomena
Mathilde Comont as Mamina

References

Bibliography
 Solomon, Aubrey. The Fox Film Corporation, 1915-1935: A History and Filmography McFarland, 2011.

External links 
 

1934 films
Fox Film films
American drama films
1934 drama films
Films directed by George Fitzmaurice
American black-and-white films
Films set in England
Films based on British novels
Films set in the 1910s
American World War I films
1930s English-language films
1930s American films